Juan Kavanagh (12 September 1931 – 2 July 1992) was a Venezuelan fencer. He competed in the individual and team foil events at the 1952 Summer Olympics.

References

External links
 

1931 births
1992 deaths
Venezuelan male foil fencers
Olympic fencers of Venezuela
Fencers at the 1952 Summer Olympics